In physics, a quantum (plural quanta) is the minimum amount of any physical entity (physical property) involved in an interaction. The fundamental notion that a physical property can be "quantized" is referred to as "the hypothesis of quantization". This means that the magnitude of the physical property can take on only discrete values consisting of integer multiples of one quantum.

For example, a photon is a single quantum of light of a specific frequency (or of any other form of electromagnetic radiation). Similarly, the energy of an electron bound within an atom is quantized and can exist only in certain discrete values. (Atoms and matter in general are stable because electrons can exist only at discrete energy levels within an atom.) Quantization is one of the foundations of the much broader physics of quantum mechanics. Quantization of energy and its influence on how energy and matter interact (quantum electrodynamics) is part of the fundamental framework for understanding and describing nature.

Etymology and discovery
The word quantum is the neuter singular of the Latin interrogative adjective quantus, meaning "how much". "Quanta", the neuter plural, short for "quanta of electricity" (electrons), was used in a 1902 article on the photoelectric effect by Philipp Lenard, who credited Hermann von Helmholtz for using the word in the area of electricity. However, the word quantum in general was well known before 1900, e.g. quantum was used in E.A. Poe's Loss of Breath.  It was often used by physicians, such as in the term quantum satis, "the amount which is enough". Both Helmholtz and Julius von Mayer were physicians as well as physicists. Helmholtz used quantum with reference to heat in his article on Mayer's work, and the word quantum can be found in the formulation of the first law of thermodynamics by Mayer in his letter dated July 24, 1841.

In 1901, Max Planck used quanta to mean "quanta of matter and electricity", gas, and heat. In 1905, in response to Planck's work and the experimental work of Lenard (who explained his results by using the term quanta of electricity), Albert Einstein suggested that radiation existed in spatially localized packets which he called "quanta of light" ("Lichtquanta").

The concept of quantization of radiation was discovered in 1900 by Max Planck, who had been trying to understand the emission of radiation from heated objects, known as black-body radiation. By assuming that energy can be absorbed or released only in tiny, differential, discrete packets (which he called "bundles", or "energy elements"), Planck accounted for certain objects changing color when heated. On December 14, 1900, Planck reported his findings to the German Physical Society, and introduced the idea of quantization for the first time as a part of his research on black-body radiation. As a result of his experiments, Planck deduced the numerical value of h, known as the Planck constant, and reported more precise values for the unit of electrical charge and the Avogadro–Loschmidt number, the number of real molecules in a mole, to the German Physical Society. After his theory was validated, Planck was awarded the Nobel Prize in Physics for his discovery in 1918.

Quantization

While quantization was first discovered in electromagnetic radiation, it describes a fundamental aspect of energy not just restricted to photons.
In the attempt to bring theory into agreement with experiment, Max Planck postulated that electromagnetic energy is absorbed or emitted in discrete packets, or quanta.

See also

 Particle
 Elementary particle
 Subatomic particle
 Graviton
 Introduction to quantum mechanics
 Magnetic flux quantum
 Photon polarization
 Quantum cellular automata
 Quantum channel
 Quantum chromodynamics
 Quantum cognition
 Quantum coherence
 Quantum computer
 Quantum cryptography
 Quantum dot
 Quantum electronics
 Quantum entanglement
 Quantum fiction
 Quantum field theory
 Quantum suicide and immortality
 Quantum lithography
 Quantum mechanics
 Quantum mind
 Quantum mysticism
 Quantum number
 Quantum optics
 Quantum sensor
 Quantum state
 Quantum teleportation

References

Further reading
B. Hoffmann, The Strange Story of the Quantum, Pelican 1963. 
Lucretius, On the Nature of the Universe, transl. from the Latin by R.E. Latham, Penguin Books Ltd., Harmondsworth 1951. 
J. Mehra and H. Rechenberg, The Historical Development of Quantum Theory, Vol.1, Part 1, Springer-Verlag, New York 1982. 
M. Planck, A Survey of Physical Theory, transl. by R. Jones and D.H. Williams, Methuen & Co., Ltd., London 1925 (Dover editions 1960 and 1993) including the Nobel lecture. 
Rodney, Brooks (2011) Fields of Color: The theory that escaped Einstein. Allegra Print & Imaging. 

Quantum mechanics